İrfan Şahin (born 1963, in İzmit, Turkey) Turkish TV Professional, CEO of DTV.

İrfan Şahin, who has been the pioneer by implementing many initiatives in Turkish TV industry, is also one of the names behind the success of Turkish dramas in international area.
Having completed primary and secondary education in İzmit, he attended Police College (High School) and graduated with the highest grade. Then, as he was continuing his education at Police Academy, he also studied at Ankara University Political Science Faculty. He worked as a deputy inspector in Ankara Police Headquarters for 2 years. In the following years, he headed towards to banking sector and worked as an auditor for 3 years at Yapı ve Kredi Bank and then at İktisat Bank.

In 1992, he started his media career at Show TV, then in 1996 he worked as deputy general manager and general manager at CINE 5 respectively. In 1998, he turned back to banking sector and was assigned as general manager responsible for personal banking.

In 2004, he joined Doğan Group and became general manager at ANS Production Company. In 2006, he was appointed as head of Kanal D and thereafter Kanal D achieved a high level of success with taking the position of leading channel.

In 2010, he was assigned as CEO of DTV, which is one of the biggest media groups in Turkey.

Irfan Sahin left Dogan TV Group in 2015. Today, he continues to develop and produce projects both locally and internationally as the founder of the production company, 1441 Productions.

Career

Media career
In 1992, he decided to change his area of business and continue his career at media industry. He started to work at Show TV. In 1996, he worked as deputy general manager at CINE 5, which was the first and only pay-TV channel in Turkey at that time. In 1998, he turned back to banking sector and was assigned as general manager responsible for personal banking.

He again began to work at CINE 5 in 1999 as general manager. Up until 2004, along with CINE 5, he carried on general manager position at Marie Claire Magazine and also had been a member or president of executive board committees, including media and telecommunication companies.

Joining Doğan Group
He started to work for Doğan Group as general manager at ANS Production Company in 2004. The very first project that he involved in both as a producer and creator, was a Turkish series, Gümüş, known also as Nur internationally. Gümüş also went down in history as for being the first TV series which made Turkish drama industry open up to the World. Up until now it has been broadcast in 78 countries and the final episode was watched by 85 million people in MENA region. No other series has been reached that much success in this region till today. On June 17, 2010, New York Times published an article about the reasons behind this success and effects created by the series over the region, and made an interview with him. Together with this, there have been hundreds of news about Gümüş in international area. İrfan Şahin, personally, has been contributed a lot for Turkish series to take part in international market.

In 2006, Şahin was assigned to the position of head of Kanal D. In the term of his management, Kanal D became the leading channel in Turkey and he brought a major change to the perspective of Turkish TV market. For the pursuit of this change, İrfan Şahin and his team positioned Kanal D as a mainstream entertainment channel by detaching Kanal D from thematic channels which broadcast programs from a very wide range of genres. In line with this strategy, it was accepted that Turkish family consisted of five members (mother, father, two children, grandparent) and screen content of Kanal D was designed in accordance with expectations of Turkish family with the aim of making whole family watch at the same time. Beside, the motto of Kanal D was changed as "The channel of Turkey".  
In the following years, Kanal D achieved a high level of success in both rating, brand equity and profitability, that any other TV channel in the history of Turkish private TV market had done before. In order to exemplify, by being the winner for 274 days in 2009, 309 days in 2010, 237 days in 2011, Kanal D overtly outscored its competitors. 
The pillars behind this outstanding success were dramas like Binbir Gece, Yaprak Dökümü, Aşk-ı Memnu, Kuzey Güney, Öyle Bir Geçer Zaman Ki, Fatmagül'ün Suçu Ne? and Arka Sokaklar. Each of them can be seen as a success story by reaching very high nationwide ratings and being well-appreciated by other countries.
Binbir Gece  was sold in many countries and gained a remarkable success in each country where it was aired. Fatmagül’ün Suçu Ne? can be regarded as a triggering story to highlight the importance of women rights both in Turkey and other regions it was broadcast, especially in MENA. Aşk-ı Memnu became a very well-known brand with its special production design unique to itself. Kuzey Güney achieved to break the records of sales prices in international area and became more expensive than the Hollywood content.
İrfan Şahin wrote the story of Kayıp, aired on Kanal D in 2013, as well. Kayıp has been known for its advanced technical base in terms of production quality, which no other dramas in Turkey had reached before.

In addition to dramas, there was a transformation in studio formats. Doktorum (#979 episodes) reached high coverage together with changing the general ambiance of daytime programming culture into a more socially responsible manner. Also, Ben Bilmem Eşim Bilir (My Partner Knows) is a format created by him, still continuing nearly after 290 episodes of broadcast at Kanal D and in order to contribute to awareness of this format in international area, he has made successful attempts.

Along with drama and program production, Şahin and his team made Turkish adaptations from some of US formats like Revenge, Desperate Housewives, Monk. As an adaptation, Turkish version of Desperate Housewives were highly appreciated. Also, for another important example to demonstrate their success in adaptation, Turkish version of Revenge was sold by Disney in MENA region at a price which is more expensive than the US version. 
In 2011, with his attempt, an aid campaign “Van İçin Tek Yürek” (Union for Van) was immediately started after Van earthquake in Turkey and every citizen was called to help people living in Van. Nearly all celebrities in Turkey took part in this campaign and it was simulcasted on Kanal D and all of the other channels in Turkey at the same time. This campaign can be seen as the most successful campaign ever made in Turkey and was awarded by many parties.

He also contributed a lot for the development of D Productions, which has been producing many successful screen contents like Öyle Bir Geçer Zaman Ki, Güneşi Beklerken, Küçük Kadınlar, Yalan Dünya, Geniş Aile, Ben Bilmem Eşim Bilir and Evim Şahane, to become one of the leading content production companies in Turkey. With these contents, it contributes a lot to Kanal D's success both in reaching nationwide high ratings and providing content for distribution in international area.

Dogan TV online properties became the third largest video network in Turkey after YouTube and Facebook. (Comscore Video Metrics, March 2015)  In terms of digital investment, a brand-new digital platform, Radyonom.com, which gathers niche music themes together under an independent radio portal special for internet, was also developed. Beside, for the first time in Turkey a television content, Ulan İstanbul, was transferred to web and continued to be aired on a digital platform. Also, taking social media assets like Twitter, Facebook, Instagram into account, total followers of social media profiles are now above 10 million people.
At the same time, with DMC's attempt, another digital platform, NetD Music, was also established. It was an important step for music industry in Turkey for having a platform like NetD Music which gathers digital intellectual rights of Turkish music videos on the same platform.
In 2010, he was assigned as CEO in Doğan TV Holding, which is a media company including Kanal D as well as other free-to-air channels (CNN Türk, TV2), radio companies, digital platform, production companies, music production companies.

Reed MIDEM, organiser of the leading international TV content market MIPTV, announced that Irfan Sahin was presented with the MIPTV Médaille d'Honneur Award in Cannes on Wednesday April 15, 2015.

Created in 2013 to mark the 50th anniversary of MIPTV, the prestigious Médaille d'Honneur is awarded to top level executives who have, through their talent, leadership, and passion, made a significant contribution to the world of television and to the development of the international TV community. This is the first time a Turkish TV executive will receive the MIPTV Médaille d'Honneur.

References

Turkish television people
Living people
1963 births
People from İzmit